Munehiro Kaneko (born June 6, 1968) is a retired male decathlete from Japan.

International competitions

References

1968 births
Living people
Japanese decathletes
Asian Games gold medalists for Japan
Asian Games gold medalists in athletics (track and field)
Athletes (track and field) at the 1990 Asian Games
Athletes (track and field) at the 1994 Asian Games
Medalists at the 1990 Asian Games
World Athletics Championships athletes for Japan
Japan Championships in Athletics winners